Holland High School is a Division 1 public high school in Holland, Michigan.  The schools colors are Red and white. The athletic nickname is "The Dutch".

Campus
The current facility was opened in 1962 on Van Raalte Avenue at a 10-12 facility. The campus consisted of seven buildings: East Unit, West Unit, Arts Center, Library and Administration, Fieldhouse, Industrial Arts and Performing Arts Center. The campus was previously at 96 W 15th st. Because the buildings were not connected, students went outside during class changes.

Renovations in 1990 and 1991 connected all buildings except the Performing Arts Center and also added a building for Math and Science. In addition, new offices, an auxiliary gym and a cafeteria were constructed. The ninth grade moved to Holland High in the fall of 1992 from Holland Junior High.

Holland High was under major reconstruction from 2012 to 2014 and all wings except for the gyms and the Performing Arts Center were completely rebuilt on their original footprints. The building housed grades 8 - 12 from 2009 to 2018, and began hosting 9-12 only in the 2018-19 school year. There are two amphitheaters in the school.

Band
The Holland High Marching Band is known for performing in wooden shoes during parades.  The band's trademark song is "Tiptoe Through the Tulips", which it performs ever year during Holland's annual Tulip Time Festival.

Demographics
The demographic breakdown of the 1,055 students enrolled in 2020–2021 was:

 Male - 50.5%
 Female - 49.5%
 Asian - 2.6%
 Black - 7.5%
 Hispanic - 49.8%
 Pacific Islander - 0.1%
 White - 35.9%
 Multiracial - 4.5%

In addition, 617 students (58.5%) were eligible for reduced-price or free lunch.

Notable alumni
Betsy Aardsma,  unsolved murder 1969
Bob Armstrong,  American basketball player Philadelphia Warriors (1956–1957)
 Coreontae DeBerry,  American basketball player
 John Essebagger Jr. (d. 1951), U.S. Army Corporal, Korean War; Medal of Honor
William C. Vandenberg, former Lieutenant Governor of Michigan
 Gordon Douglas Yntema (d. 1968), U.S. Army Sergeant, Vietnam War; Medal of Honor

References

Public high schools in Michigan
Buildings and structures in Holland, Michigan
Schools in Ottawa County, Michigan
Educational institutions established in 1848
1848 establishments in Michigan